William Connell may refer to:

 William Connell (priest) (died 1762), Anglican priest
 William Connell (Australian politician) (1891–1945), member of the Tasmanian House of Assembly
 William Connell (Pennsylvania politician) (1827–1909), U.S. Representative from Pennsylvania
 William James Connell (1846–1924), U.S. Representative from Nebraska
 William J. Connell (historian) (born 1958), American historian
 William J. McConnell (1839–1925), U.S. Senator and Governor of Idaho